Veggie Grill is a fast-casual vegan restaurant chain that operates in California, Oregon, Washington, Illinois, Massachusetts, and New York. The first restaurant opened in 2006 in Irvine, California and is operating 29 restaurants as of February 2018. The chain focuses on offering only plant-based food, with no meat, dairy, eggs, LDL cholesterol, animal fat or trans fat.

In 2013 the company raised $20 million in capital, mainly from Brentwood Associates, and announced plans for national expansion.

History 
Investor Kevin Boylan and T.K. Pillan were discussing various new projects and, after personally experiencing the effects of a vegetarian-based diet, they wanted to create a way to share the diet with a larger audience. In 2006, they co-founded Veggie Grill, which has since grown to be the largest vegetarian and vegan restaurant company in the U.S. The two brought capital and strategic business skills to the table. Pillan focused on the developing the overall brand and guest experience while Boylan made sure they got the right real-estate and financing as Veggie Grill started to grow. With no restaurant experience between them, they recruited chef Ray White to help create their menu. White had been working with plant-based food for many years prior and focused on adding food textures to the menu that were familiar to the meat-eating population. Veggie Grill now has a customer base of 70% non-vegetarians.

Expansion 
Veggie Grill plans to double in the next couple of years. In early 2018, the restaurant opened  two locations in Chicago, its first locations outside of the West Coast. Veggie Grill also intends to open four more Chicago-area locations at an undetermined date. In 2019 they opened a location in Harvard Square in Cambridge, Massachusetts, its first East Coast location.

Partnerships and menu 
In 2016, Veggie Grill partnered with Beyond Meat to create their plant-based burgers. Gardein is also a key plant-based protein supplier for Veggie Grill. Additionally, they offer cheese alternative products from Follow Your Heart.

Critical acclaim 
Veggie Grill was voted "Best American" cuisine restaurant by The Los Angeles Times readers in 2012.

Veggie Grill received VegNews Magazine's winner for Favorite Vegan Chain in 2016, 2017, and 2018.

Veggie Grill made the list for 25 Most Innovative Consumer Brands of 2016 by Forbes.

See also 
 List of vegetarian restaurants
 Veganism

References

External links
Official website

Fast-food chains of the United States
Restaurants established in 2006
Companies based in Los Angeles County, California
Restaurants in California
Vegan restaurants in the United States
2006 establishments in California